The Coon Creek Bridge is a historic bridge in rural western Benton County, Arkansas. The bridge carries County Road 24 (Coon Hollow Road) across Coon Creek between Decatur and the Oklahoma state line. It was built in 1930 and underwent major rehabilitation in 1975.

The bridge was listed on the National Register of Historic Places in 2007.

See also
National Register of Historic Places listings in Benton County, Arkansas
List of bridges on the National Register of Historic Places in Arkansas

References

Road bridges on the National Register of Historic Places in Arkansas
Bridges completed in 1930
National Register of Historic Places in Benton County, Arkansas
Warren truss bridges in the United States
Transportation in Benton County, Arkansas
1930 establishments in Arkansas